The 1965 Australian Tourist Trophy was a motor race staged at the Lakeside circuit in Queensland, Australia on 14 November 1965. It was the ninth annual Australian Tourist Trophy race. The race was open to sports cars as defined by the Confederation of Australian Motor Sport (CAMS) in its Appendix C regulations, and it was recognized by CAMS as the Australian championship for sports cars. It was won by Ian Geoghegan driving a Lotus 23b.

Race review
Australian international driver Frank Gardner set the fastest practice time driving Alec Mildren's Mildren Maserati, but an engine failure during a preliminary heat resulted in Gardner being a non-starter in the Tourist Trophy. Ian Geoghegan, driving a Lotus 23, dominated the race with Greg Cusack (Lotus 23) placed second and Spencer Martin (Ferrari 250LM) third. Englishman Ken Miles, driving a Shelby Cobra 427 entered by Shelby American, posed a threat to leaders Geoghegan and Cusack until a suspension failure on lap 34 led to his retirement.

Results

Race statistics
 Race distance: 83 laps – 125 miles (200 km)
 Pole position: Ian Geoghegan (Lotus 23b), 59.9s
 Number of starters: 13
 Number of finishers: not yet ascertained
 Winner's race time: 1:25:38.90
 Winner's average speed: 87.23 mph
 Fastest lap: 60.9 -  Ian Geoghegan

References

Australian Tourist Trophy
Tourist Trophy
Sports competitions in Queensland